is a 1987 American-Japanese animated superhero film jointly produced by Hanna-Barbera Productions and Tsuburaya Productions and animated by both Studio Sign and Ashi Productions. It is the second foreign Ultra Series production overall, and the second foreign Ultraman film after The 6 Ultra Brothers vs. the Monster Army. Originally intended as a pilot for an animated series, no such series ever emerged and the pilot was made into a full-length film. It was released in theaters in the United States on October 12, 1987, with a Japanese theatrical release following on April 28, 1989. The costumes based on the three main heroes (the Ultra Team) were made for use in stage shows in Japan.

Plot
A stunt pilot trio called the "Flying Angels" (Scott Masterson, Chuck Gavin, and Beth O'Brien), are caught in a bizarre flash of light and crash, only to emerge unharmed. They are later informed by an agent of an interstellar peace-keeping agency (whose secret identity is the groundskeeper at a Pebble Beach golf course) that they have become the hosts to three warriors from the planet Altara in M78 to capture escaped monsters from the destroyed planet Sorkin who have arrived on Earth. They become the Ultra Force, headquartered within Mount Rushmore, and are assisted by a trio of robots (the pint-sized Andy, the strong Samson, and the twitchy Ulysses). Although equipped with futuristic fighter crafts, inevitably one or more of the team is required to transform into an Ultraman, a gigantic red and silver superhuman being, to battle the monsters. After destroying the most powerful Sorkin monster, the constantly growing King Maira, the Ultra Force remains together to combat further threats to Earth.

Characters

Ultra Force
 is an organization formed by a mysterious old man, Walter Freeman. The headquarters is in the basement of the Georgia National Golf Club and there is a mechanic hangar at Mount Rushmore.
Members
Scott Masterson: The story's young protagonist. Transforms into . 25 years old. Integrated with Ultraman Scott. A character with no eyes on young women. He is pleased with Susan.
Chuck Gavin: The toughest and oldest of the team and the de facto leader of the Ultra Team. Transforms into , one of the Ultra fighters who came to the earth with other Ultra team members following the Sorkin Monster. 35 years old. Integrated with Ultraman Chuck. Leader rank at the battle scene.
Beth O'Brien: The cool-headed female of the team. Transforms into . A woman Ultra fighter who came to the earth with another Ultra Team member following the Sorkin Monster. 26 years old. Integrated with Ultra Woman Beth. She attends a dance class on a holiday.
The Robot Trio: A group of support robots built to assist the Ultra Force. Their true names were too long for the team to remember, so they were given nicknames by Scott (who came up with "Ulysses" and "Samson") and Beth (who came up with "Andy"). The initials in their names form the letters "USA".
Ulysses: The thin and effeminate robot in orange. His true name is Combot Model MF842.
Samson: The big and strong robot in blue. His true name is Combot Model BA666.
Andy: The pint-sized robot in red. His true name is Utiloid Model ZQ14582. In charge of the Transportation System.
Walter Freeman: An elderly man in his late 60s who forms the Ultra Force. He explains to the heroes the true cause of their accident and the origins of their powers. His relation to the Ultra beings and how he knows about them is never revealed.
Dr. Susan Rand: A young scientist from the Federation for Extraterrestrial Research (or F.E.R. Labs). She has sympathy towards the Sorkin Monsters fought by the Ultra Force. She gets romantically connected with Scott.

Mecha
Ultra Force has a mecha used to defend the Earth against the Sorkin monsters. 
 Ultra Force Headquarters: Located in the basement of the Georgia National Golf Club and there is a mechanic hangar at Mount Rushmore.
 Mothership: Ultra Force's mother ship. Equipped with three Ultra Jets. In the game against King Mylar, it is possible to collect sunlight by supplementing it with the parabola installed on the Ultra team that was running out of energy or to carry the Ultra Team to the outside of the atmosphere. Vertical takeoff and landing is possible with the wing engine.
 Ultra Jets: A fighter that Scott and others pilot it. The flight speed is Mach 7.3. Equipped with anti-monster missiles and a laser. The canopy painted in Scott's jet is blue, Beth's jet is red and Chuck's jet is yellow.

Ultras

Ultraman Scott
One of the Ultra fighters who came from the M78 Nebula which came to Earth following the Sorkin Monster. It became a one-sided entity living in Captain Scott Masterson of the American Air Force's acrobat flight team "Flying Angels", initially able to transform himself during a crisis, but also became able to transform on his own will in the middle. Having a buckle with a blue star shape in the abdomen, when the solar energy decreases, the beam lamp on the forehead flashes from blue to red and issues a warning sound. He threw Garuballade at power plants, etc., and they are good at the somewhat rough fighting way.

Stats
Height: 269 feet
Weight: 64.000 Tons
Flight Speed: Mach 24

Weapons
 Granium Light Ray: A group of rays that gathers energy of the granite, combines both hands in a cross and releases it. Although it is a common technique of the 3 warriors, only Scott used it alone. If three people shoot at the same time Ultra Synchro Beam will increase its power.
 Ultra Energy Ball: Condensed energy discharged from the waist buckle and thrown into the light bulb. It damaged the main Im of the Garuballade.
 Ultra Slicer: A technique to make the granular energy into a circular saw and throw it. He threw it in two consecutive angles to the Im damaged by the Ultra Energy Ball and it split into four. Then he gave out the Granium Rays and extinguished the Im.
 Ultra Push Beam: After assembling the arms in the opposite shape to the Granium Ray, it is a yellow ray that shoots like a strip from the left hand he stood. It emanates on the Zoon wrapped in Ultraman Chuck's "Ultra Bubble Beam" and pushes it towards the Andromeda Nebula's planet M11.
 Triple Power: A counterattack to an enemy approaching at high speed.
 Ultra Throw: A technique to throw away the opponent with a mighty power. He threw away a huge Garuballade boasting a body length of 150m or more from the city of San Francisco to the Alcatraz Island in the offing.
 Ultra Attack: After rushing at a tremendous speed, with a meatball skill that hits the whole body weight against the enemy, it has the power to blow huge enemies by hundreds of meters. They extended out of the air towards the third form of King Myra who had destroyed the city area of New York and temporarily broke it.

Ultraman Chuck
Like Scott, Captain Chuck Gavin, one of the Flying Angels, and became one and the same. It is close to the command tower that dealt with things calmly and instructs the other two people. When the solar energy decreases, the beam lamp on the forehead flashes from blue to red and issues a warning sound.

Stats
Height: 259 feet
Weight: 68.000 Tons
Flight Speed: Mach 22

Weapons
 Granium Light Ray: The Plus style laser weapon.
 Ultra Bubble Beam: An energy beam that creates a bubble around a monster to transport them through space.

Ultrawoman Beth
Just like the other two, who lived in Lieutenant Beth O'Brien at Flying Angels. When the solar energy decreases, the beam lamp on the forehead flashes from blue to red and issues a warning sound. At the time the movie was released in Japan she was known as Ultra Woman.

Stats
Height: 249 feet
Weight: 54.000 Tons
Flight Speed: Mach 23

Weapons
 Granium Light Ray: The Plus style laser weapon.
 Ultra Spout: A laser weapon she can fire from her hands when she is above a body of water.
 Ultra Chop : Attack attacking enemies with hand-swords while releasing energy from the body to the hand. She quickly tore up the tentacles of Green Shocks.
 Ultra Power: A strong technique that throws enemies many times higher than herself.

The Sorkin Monsters

Green Shocks
The vegetation monster. Has accelerated regeneration and powerful vines.

Stats
 Height: 328 feet (initial, can vary)
 Weight: 30,000 tons (initial, can vary)

Garuballade
The electronic machinery monster. Superficially resembles a crystal ball (with a creature face in the center) and uses scrap metal from machinery to construct itself a monster body. The ball phase, standing on its long spinal tail, is called the Im (pronounced "eem").

Stats
 Height: 300 feet (Im: 500 feet)
 Weight: 91,000 tons (Im: 27,000 tons)

Zoon
A friendly, dragon-like monster of stout stature, Zoon landed in Utah, where his presence at a ski resort caused the US Military to confront him. Fortunately, Ultraman Chuck intervened and guided him back to space, sending him on his way to a new home.

Stats
 Height: 114 feet
 Weight: 35,000 tons

King Myra
The most powerful of the Sorkin beasts. A "super transformation" monster who can double his size every 90 minutes without limit. He can also become invisible. His initial infant form (Wylon) is actually small and adorable. The Ultra Force had the most difficult time with him as his increased growth spurts resulted in deadlier abilities used against them.

Stats
 Height: Infinite in growth (Wylon: 15 inches)
 Weight: Infinite in growth (Wylon: 11 lbs.)

Voice cast

Crew
 Director: Mitsuo Kusakabe
 Screenplay: John Eric Seward
 Character design: Kazuo Iimura
 Hero design: Hitoshi Yoshida 
 Mechanic design: Tomohiko Sato
 Monster design: Keita Amemiya, Hirotoshi Murayama, Chisato Sugiura
 Art director: Akira Furuya
 Color: Koji Wakai, Yuko Koshiba 
 Drawing directors: Kazuo Iimura, Osamu Tsuruyama, Yuuki Kudo, Nobuyoshi Habara
 Storyboards: Seiji Okuda, Satoshi Nagao, Mitsuo Kusakabe, Toshio Ohba
 Cinematographer: Toshiaki Morita 
 Editor: Naoki Masaki
 Sound director: Noriyoshi Matsuura
 Japanese version directed by: Riku Matsukawa 
 Sound effects: Swirl production
 Development: Tokyo Development Office
 Music: Shingo Futo
 Music producer: Hidetoshi Kimura
 Creative producers: Jeff Segal, Kelly Ward
 Supervising director: Ray Patterson
 Production supervisor: Ken Mimura
 Creative design: Iwao Takamoto
 Key character design: Floro Dery
 Key background supervisor: Al Gmuer
 Editorial supervisor: Larry Cowan
 Voice director: Gordon Hunt
 Animation casting director: Andrea Romano
 Talent coordinator: Kris Zimmerman
 Executive producer: Jane Barbera
 Executive coordinator: Kiyotaka Ukawa
 Associate producer: Shizuka Tamagawa 
 Executive producers: Noboru Tsuburaya, William Hanna, Joseph Barbera
 Animation producers: Masayoshi Ozaki (Studio Sain), Go Eto (Tsuburaya Productions)
 Cooperation: Studio Zain, Sakai Production, Ryu Production
 Production partnership: Tsuburaya Productions, Hanna-Barbera Productions, Kodansha, Nippon Columbia, Bandai
 Production: Tsuburaya Productions

Music

Songs
Main theme

Lyrics: Yū Aku
Composition: Shunichi Tokura
Arrangement: Shinsuke Kazato
Artist: Shinichi Ishihara, Koorogi '73

Image theme

Lyrics: Yū Aku
Composition: Shunichi Tokura
Arrangement: Shinsuke Kazato
Artist: Shinichi Ishihara, Koorogi '73

Soundtrack
The music was composed by Shinsuke Kazato and released by Nippon Columbia. The soundtrack was released as a limited edition printing of 5,000 copies.

Home media
Ultraman USA was released in Japan by Bandai Home Video on VHS (Japanese dub only) on September 29, 1989 and on LaserDisc (bilingual) on July 25, 1991. In North America, a VHS was released by Ultra Action Video and L.A. Hero Inc. on June 2, 1993.

Tsubaraya announced that Bandai Visual will release a remastered version of the film on Blu-ray in Japan on September 26, 2018.

Other appearances
 Ultraman Legend, This cast gets new live-action footage in this short, which features fight scenes of each of the 28 Ultras from the original Ultraman to Ultraman Cosmos.
 Mega Monster Battle: Ultra Galaxy Legend The Movie (2009), Ultraman USA, along with other M78 Ultra Warriors, fights against the evil Ultraman Belial. This marks their second-ever live appearances onscreen, after the "Shinseiki Ultraman Densetsu" featurette.

 Ultra Galaxy Fight: The Destined Crossroad (2022), the 3 main Ultras appeared in the fourth episode of the web series in which they confront Absolute Titan at Planet Babel.

Notes

References

Sources

External links
 
 

1980s American animated films
1987 anime films
Animated action films
Ashi Productions
American animated science fiction films
Hanna-Barbera animated films
Toho films
Japanese animated science fiction films
Ultra Series films
1980s Japanese-language films
Extraterrestrials in anime and manga
Films directed by Ray Patterson (animator)
1980s English-language films